The Australian and New Zealand Law and History Society was founded in 1993 and is a learned society for legal historians. Its membership is based primarily in Australia and New Zealand, and includes professional and academic historians as well as lawyers. Its main function is to organise an annual legal history conference, and it also publishes occasional journals, most recently the Australian and New Zealand Law and History Society e-Journal.

External links
 Australian and New Zealand Law and History Society website

Legal organisations based in Australia
Learned societies of Australia
History organisations based in Australia
Legal history of Australia
Legal history of New Zealand
1993 establishments in Australia